Leslie Geissler Munger (born September 5, 1956) is an American politician and business executive who served as the Illinois Comptroller in 2015 and 2016.  She was appointed by incoming Governor Bruce Rauner to fill the vacancy caused by the death of re-elected Comptroller Judy Baar Topinka.

Career
Munger is a former corporate executive for Helene Curtis/Unilever.  She oversaw the United States hair care business for Helene Curtis from 1984 to 2001 under former CEO Ron Gidwitz.

Political career
In 2014, Munger ran for the Illinois House of Representatives in the 59th District against incumbent Democrat Carol Sente but narrowly lost.

After the sudden death of Comptroller Judy Baar Topinka, then-Governor-elect Bruce Rauner appointed Munger as Comptroller. She was sworn in on January 12, 2015, the same date as Rauner and the other elected officials.

On November 8, 2016, Democrat Susana Mendoza defeated Munger in a special election for Illinois Comptroller. The normally low-key comptroller's race became a high-profile, big-budget campaign seen as a proxy battle between Democratic House Speaker Michael Madigan and Republican Gov. Bruce Rauner.

On February 3, 2017, Munger was hired as a staffer in the office of Governor Rauner with the title of deputy governor.

Electoral history

References

1956 births
21st-century American politicians
21st-century American women politicians
Comptrollers of Illinois
Illinois Republicans
Kellogg School of Management alumni
Living people
People from Lincolnshire, Illinois
University of Illinois alumni
Women in Illinois politics